At the 1994 Goodwill Games, the athletics events were held in July at the Petrovsky Stadium in Saint Petersburg, Russia. A total of 44 events were contested, of which 22 were by male and 22 by female athletes. The marathon event was dropped for the 1994 edition and racewalking events took place on the track, making the entire athletics programme a track and field-only affair. The United States won the most gold medals (18) in the athletics competition, but Russia had the greatest total medal haul, winning 41 medals, 10 of which were gold. Cuba, Great Britain and Kenya were the next best achievers in the medal count.

The competition remained invitation-only and each event was contested in a single final format. Fifteen Goodwill Games records were equalled or improved at the competition, and Marina Pluzhnikova achieved a world record in the little-contested 2000 metres steeplechase (although the IAAF does not ratify world records for that distance). The United States completed medal sweeps in the men's 100 metres, long jump, decathlon and women's 400 metres. Noureddine Morceli's winning time of 3:48.67 in the mile run was a games record and the fastest of 1994. In spite of appearances from prominent athletes such as Sergey Bubka, Irina Privalova and Carl Lewis, the stadium failed to reach much more than half of its 28,000 capacity over the five-day competition.

Gwen Torrence completed a 100/200 metres double and added the 4×100 metres relay for a third gold of the competition. Irina Privalova was runner-up to Torrence in both the individual sprints. Russia's Yelena Romanova retained her 5000 metres crown and also won the 3000 metres race. Jackie Joyner-Kersee won her third consecutive heptathlon title, having dominated the event since the games' inception. Two American men retained their titles won four years previously at the 1990 Goodwill Games: Michael Johnson in the 200 metres and Kenny Harrison in the triple jump. The performances of former champions Bubka and Lewis did not meet expectations; Bubka, representing Ukraine, managed only 5.70 m for the bronze in the pole vault while Lewis's run of 10.23 seconds in the 100 m left him in fourth place.

Records

Medal summary

Men

Women

Medal table

Participation

References

Results
Goodwill Games. GBR Athletics. Retrieved on 2010-06-28.
Athletics results. Goodwill Games (archived)

External links
Official website (archived)

1994 Goodwill Games
1994
Goodwill Games
International athletics competitions hosted by Russia